This article details Trailer Nos. 40–41 of the Manx Electric Railway on the Isle of Man.

These two trailers were supplied as replacements for those lost in the Laxey Car Sheds fire of 1930 but are of similar construction to the earlier trailers; they are the youngest rolling stock on the line, save for the motor car No. 22 which was completely rebuilt following a fire in 1992 and converted trailer No. 56.

References

Sources
 Manx Manx Electric Railway Fleetlist (2002) Manx Electric Railway Society
 Island Island Images: Manx Electric Railway Pages (2003) Jon Wornham
 Official Official Tourist Department Page (2009) Isle Of Man Heritage Railways

Manx Electric Railway